Tek Tek Mountains National Park, established on May 29, 2007, is a national park in southeastern Turkey. It is located in Şanlıurfa.

References

National parks of Turkey
Mountain ranges of Turkey
Geography of Şanlıurfa Province
Landforms of Şanlıurfa Province
Tourist attractions in Şanlıurfa Province
Şanlıurfa
2007 establishments in Turkey
Protected areas established in 2007